Zhejiang California International NanoSystems Institute (Traditional Chinese: 浙江加州國際納米研究院, Simplified Chinese: 浙江加州国际纳米研究院; abbr. ZCINI), is a Sino-American co-founded institute for nanoscience and nanotechnology research located in Hangzhou, Zhejiang Province, People's Republic of China.

Introduction 
It is the first (of this kind) platform of research and technology innovation in China, and it was established in June, 2005, by the joint efforts from the Zhejiang Provincial Government, Zhejiang University, and the California Nanosystems Institute (CNSI), UCLA.

The institute mainly consulted from the successful experience from the California NanoSystems Institute (CNSI); and it is mainly coupled with the research departments of both sides including the Zhejiang University.

The coordinational committee are also from three aspects: the local government of Zhejiang Province, the Zhejiang University and the California NanoSystems Institute (CNSI).

Mission statements 

The institute encourages interdisciplinary studies combining chemistry, biology, medicine, material science, information technology, etc. It tries to become the effective catalyst for integrating both academics and industries, and play an important role in promoting local (Yangtze River Delta Region) industries. At beginning, it will try to serve or support the local industries and their related research.

References

External links
 Zhejiang California International NanoSystems Institute (Chinese Homepage)
 Zhejiang California International NanoSystems Institute (English Version)
 California NanoSystems Institute (Homepage)

Zhejiang California International NanoSystems Institute